The 1919 Pacific Tigers football team represented the College of the Pacific—now known as the University of the Pacific—in Stockton, California as an independent during the 1919 college football season. Led by George Sperry in his first and only season as head coach, Pacific compiled a record of 1–4. The game against on October 25, won by Nevada by a score of 132 to 0, was the worst loss in Pacific football history and the largest margin-of-victory for Nevada's football program.  The win against Mare Island at the end of the season was the first victory for the Pacific program since their establishment in 1895.

Schedule

References

Pacific
Pacific Tigers football seasons
Pacific Tigers football